Mitchell (Moyshe) Allen Silk is an American lawyer, author, and former government official. He served as Assistant Secretary of the Treasury for International Markets under President Donald Trump. He is an expert in Chinese law and finance. He previously served as Deputy Assistant Secretary from October 2017 to July 2019.

Silk is the first and only Hasidic Jew to hold a senior U.S. administration position.

Education 

Silk has a Juris Doctor degree from the University of Maryland School of Law, Certificate in Advanced Studies in Law from Beijing University, and a Bachelor of Science in Foreign Service from Georgetown University.

He also received education at National Taiwan Normal University and Middlebury College.

Legal career 

Silk began his professional career as an associate at Hughes Hubbard & Reed from 1987 to 1990, as an associate at Graham & James from 1990 to 1992, as a senior associate at Chadbourne & Parke from 1992 to 1996, as a consultant and eventually a partner and Head of China Practice at Allen & Overy from 1998 to October 2017. He spent a decade in their Hong Kong office.

Public Service
In October 2017, Silk was appointed Deputy Assistant Secretary, International Affairs at the U.S. Department of the Treasury. He was the head of the Office of Investment, Energy and Infrastructure.

In July 2019, he became the acting Assistant Secretary of the Treasury for International Markets. On September 19, 2019, President Trump formally nominated Silk to be Assistant Secretary of the Treasury for International Markets. A hearing on his nomination before the Senate Committee on Banking, Housing, and Urban Affairs was held on November 20, 2019. On April 21, 2020, the United States Senate confirmed his nomination by voice vote. Silk became the first Hasidic Jew to be confirmed to a senior U.S. administration position.

Published work

Books
Silk has published a book on Chinese environmental protection law titled: China's marine environmental protection law: The dragon creeping in murky waters, and several other books,
Taiwan Trade and Investment Law,
Environmental Law and Policy in the People's Republic of China.

Articles
Are Chinese Companies Taking Over the World?,
Taiwan trade and investment law,
Understanding China's State Secrets Laws,
Post-Mao China and Environmental Protection: The Effects of Legal and Politico-Economic Reform,
New Executive Order Seeks to Jump Start the Effort to Rebuild America's Infrastructure,
G-d Bless the good people Atlanta Georgia,
Natural gas-fired electric power plants: A key element for future U.S. energy policy,
A U.S. Treasury Official's Moving Encounter With Atlanta Yeshivah Students.

Volunteer work 
Since 2005 Silk has been doing volunteer work as the Chairman of "Agudath Israel of America Pro Bono Legal Services LLC" at the Agudath Israel of America.

Personal life 
Together with his wife Yocheved, Silk has been a resident of Borough Park, Brooklyn.

He was sworn in as Deputy Assistant Secretary with an ancient Tikkun kor'im that had belonged to Rebbe Mordechai of Nadvorna who was from Silk's grandfather's ancestral town.

He is an expert in Chinese law and finance, speaks five languages Cantonese Chinese, English, Mandarin Chinese, Hebrew, and Yiddish.

References

External links
U.S. Department of the Treasury biography

1961 births
20th-century American lawyers
21st-century American lawyers
Walsh School of Foreign Service alumni
University of Baltimore School of Law alumni
Peking University alumni
National Taiwan Normal University alumni
Middlebury College alumni
American Orthodox Jews
People from Borough Park, Brooklyn
United States Assistant Secretaries of the Treasury
Trump administration personnel
Living people
Lawyers from New York City